Gord is a given name, usually a diminutive form of Gordon, and as such is seen as uniquely and idiosyncratically Canadian.

Notable people with the name include:
Gord Downie, Canadian singer and guitarist with the Tragically Hip
 Gord Johns, Canadian politician from British Columbia
 Gord Martineau, Canadian television journalist
Gord Miller (environmental commissioner), Canadian politician and prior Environmental Commissioner of Ontario
Gord Sinclair, Canadian bass guitarist with The Tragically Hip
 Gordon Lightfoot, Canadian singer-songwriter sometimes referred to as "Gord"

Fictional characters 
 Gord the Rogue, fictional character created by Gary Gygax
Gord, fictional character in the television series Between
Gord, fictional character from the video game Mobile Legends: Bang Bang
Gord Vendome, a character in the video game Bully
Ranger Gord, fictional character on The Red Green Show

See also 

 Gord Afrid (Gordafarid) was a female warrior in Shahnama